Prisoners is a 1929 American film produced by Walter Morosco and directed by William Seiter for First National Pictures. The screenplay was written by Forrest Halsey, based on the novel by Ferenc Molnar. Lee Garmes was the cinematographer.

It was released as a part-talking, part-silent feature with Corinne Griffith, James Ford, Bela Lugosi, Ian Keith, and Otto Matiesen. Lugosi, in his first talkie, played Brottos, the owner of a Vienna nightclub. Lugosi was very happy that his first sound film was set in Hungary (where he was born) and that the story was based on a Ferenc Molnar Hungarian novel.  While Lugosi was off filming "Prisoners", he was temporarily replaced in the San Francisco "Dracula" stage play by one Frederick Pymm (who normally played Butterworth, the attendant).

The relatively short sound segment (most of the film is subtitled) picks up with the climactic trial sequence. Critics stated "Bela Lugosi makes a very European villain", but were disappointed that Griffith's character is sent off to prison at the end of the film while a "cold-blooded murderer (in one of the subplots) is kept from receiving his just punishment". Corinne Griffith (who was married to producer Morosco) later went on to become a movie producer herself, as well as a very successful novelist.

Plot
Riza Riga, a beautiful young showgirl has led a life of crime, but she wants to go straight. When she falls in love with attorney Nicholas Cathy, she plans to gain his attention by buying a beautiful new dress. But when she realizes she can't afford to buy it, she returns to crime. 
She steals some money and is caught redhanded, resulting in a criminal trial. Defense lawyer Cathy winds up defending the young girl and falls in love with her in the process. Lugosi as Brottos, the nightclub owner, lurks throughout the film in villainous fashion. In the end, Riza is found guilty and is sentenced to three months in jail, and Nicholas Cathy watches her as she is led off to prison, promising to wait for her faithfully.

Cast
 Corinne Griffith as Riza Riga, a showgirl and thief
 James Ford as Kessler
 Bela Lugosi as Brottos, a Vienna nightclub owner
 Ian Keith as Nicholas Cathy, the defense attorney
 Harry Northrup as the prosecuting attorney
 Julanne Johnston as Lenke
 Ann Schaeffer as Aunt Maria
 Barton Hesse as Kore
 Otto Matiesen as Sebfi

References

1929 films
Transitional sound films
Films directed by William A. Seiter
Films based on works by Ferenc Molnár
American black-and-white films
1920s English-language films